Shahrak-e Danial-e Shush (also Romanized as Shahrak-e Dānīāl-e Shūsh; also known as Shahrak-e Dānīāl) is a village in Hoseynabad Rural District, in the Central District of Shush County, Khuzestan Province, Iran. At the 2006 census, its population was 2,412, in 478 families.

References 

Populated places in Shush County